Celio is the 19th  of Rome, identified by the initials R. XIX, and is located within the Municipio I.

Its coat of arms depicts the bust of an African, with an elephant headdress with golden tusks on a silver background, in memory of an African bust that was found in Via Capo d'Africa.

History
Up to 1870, the area was moderately inhabited, with some major religious building and many archaeological remains appearing in the vast filed and vineyards. Following to the unification of Italy, the district was among the first to be urbanized, between 1872 and 1873, with new service buildings and residences for the newcomers.

Particularly, a military hospital was built on the summit of the Caelian hill between 1885 and 1891, close to the medieval site of Santo Stefano in Formis, an ancient monastery with an annexed hospital.

Up until the postwar period, the road scheme has been reworked in the lower part of the rione, near the Colosseo, and in 1968 a big public housing complex, that was located among Piazza Celimontana, Via Claudia, Via Annia and Via dei Simmachi, was demolished: the plot, facing the military hospital, is now a public park (Parco della Pace).

Geography
The rione was established in 1921, detaching portions of land from Monti and Campitelli. It is moderately inhabited and scarcely congested, and can be considered a working-class borough, if compared with more central rioni. However, the rione is dense with hotels and B&Bs for tourists, because of its position, very close to the Colosseo.

Boundaries
Northward, Celio borders with Monti (R. I), from which is separated by Piazza del Colosseo, Via di San Giovanni in Laterano, Via di Santo Stefano Rotondo, Via della Navicella and Piazza di Porta Metronia.

Eastward, it borders with Quartiere Appio-Latino (Q. IX), whose boundary is defined by the stretch of the Aurelian Walls between Porta Metronia and Porta San Sebastiano.

To the south, it borders with San Saba (R. XXI), from which is separated by Via di Porta San Sebastiano, Piazzale Numa Pompilio, Viale delle Terme di Caracalla, Via di Valle delle Camene.

Westward, Celio shares a short border with Ripa (R. XII), marked by Piazza di Porta Capena. It also borders with Campitelli (R. X), whose boundary is marked by Via di San Gregorio and Piazza del Colosseo.

Places of interest

Archaeological sites
 Arch of Constantine
 Arch of Dolabella
 Colosseo
 Ludus Magnus
 Villa Celimontana

Churches
 San Giovanni a Porta Latina
 San Giovanni in Oleo
 San Gregorio Magno al Celio
 Santa Maria in Domnica (Santa Maria alla Navicella)
 Santo Stefano Rotondo
 Santi Giovanni e Paolo
 Santi Quattro Coronati

Other
 Fontana della Navicella

External links

 01
Rioni of Rome